is a town located in  Yamagata Prefecture, Japan. , the town had an estimated population of 7,894 in 2828 households, and a population density of 51 persons per km2.

Geography
Ōe is located in mountainous central Yamagata. Like many small towns in Japan, Ōe is a collection of smaller hamlets. Elevation rises and populations decrease from east to west. The easternmost hamlet is Aterazawa, and contains about 4/5 of the town's population.  The town extends from the west end of the central part of the Yamagata basin to the Asahi Mountains. In addition, it has several enclaves in Sagae city and Nakayama town, bordering the east. Administratively, the town area is divided from the east into the Sazawa, Hongo, and Shichiken districts. The Mogami River forms the eastern border of the town.

Neighboring municipalities
Yamagata Prefecture
Sagae
Asahi
Nishikawa
Nakayama
Yamanobe

Climate
Ōe has a humid continental climate (Köppen climate classification Cfa) with large seasonal temperature differences, with warm to hot (and often humid) summers and cold (sometimes severely cold) winters. Precipitation is significant throughout the year, but is heaviest from August to October.

Demographics
Per Japanese census data, the population of Ōe has declined by more than half from its peak around 1950. It is now smaller than it was a century ago.

History
The area of present-day Ōe was part of ancient Dewa Province. During the Kamakura period it was controlled by the Ōe clan. During the early Edo period, it was the site of a castle and center of the briefly-lived Aterazawa Domain (12,000 koku), which was absorbed into Tsuruoka Domain. After the start of the Meiji period, the area became part of Nishimurayama District, Yamagata Prefecture. The village of Aterizawa was established on April 1, 1889 with the establishment of the modern municipalities system. The town of Ōe was established on August 20, 1959 by the merger of the town of Aterazawa and the village of Urushikawa.

Economy
The economy of Ōe is based on agriculture.

Education
Ōe has two public elementary schools and one public middle school operated by the Town government and one public high schools operated by the Yamagata Prefectural Board of Education.

Transportation

Railway
 East Japan Railway Company - Aterazawa Line

Highway

Local attractions

Events
Oe Doll's Festival (March)
Mogami River rower's song contest (June)

Landmarks
Tateyama Park(ruin of The Tateyama castle)
Yanagawa spa

References

External links

 

 
Towns in Yamagata Prefecture